Salisbury Rugby Club is an English rugby union club in Salisbury, Wiltshire, who play in the Southern Counties South league. The club is based at Hudson's Field, Castle Road, near Old Sarum.

Former players include Richard Hill (Saracens, England, British and Irish Lions), Mike Brown (Harlequins and England) and Will Stuart (Bath Rugby, England).


Honours
 Dorset & Wilts Cup winners 1989–90
 South West 2 East champions: 1997–98
 Southern Counties (north v south) promotion play-off winners: 2000–01, 2014–15
 Southern Counties South champions: 2010–11
 Southern Counties Cup winners 2014–15
South West 1 (east v west) promotion play-off winner: 2015–16

See also
 Dorset and Wilts Rugby Football Union

References

External links
 

English rugby union teams
Rugby clubs established in 1912
Rugby union in Wiltshire
Salisbury